The Lihue Hongwanji Mission, near Lihue, Hawaii on Kauai, is a historic mission whose construction was started in 1901.  It was a branch of the Honpa Hongwanji Mission of Hawaii.  It was listed on the National Register of Historic Places in 1978.  It is significant as the oldest surviving Japanese Buddhist mission on Kauai;  it "reinforced Japanese ties to the mother country by preserving the language, education and cultural foundations, of immigrant Japanese laborers."  The Lihue Plantation Company supported its development as a way of indirectly maintaining social control.  It included Sunday school classes but the Japanese language school gradually became the most important part of the mission.

It is associated with Honpa Hongwanji Mission of Hawaii.

References 

Properties of religious function on the National Register of Historic Places in Hawaii
Kauai County, Hawaii
Religious buildings and structures completed in 1901
1901 establishments in Hawaii
Honpa Hongwanji Mission of Hawaii